Höfðaletur ("head letters") is an unusual Icelandic font used in carving that has recently been adapted for use in printing. The letters do not have a fixed form.

History 
The oldest known examples of Höfðaletur are thought to be 16th century, and the font is considered to have been modeled on Gothic textura.

The letters do not have a fixed form, but the verticals all have a "head" that is decorated with carving, usually simple and sloping but sometimes double. There are many conjectures about the derivation of the name höfðaletur, but no definite evidence exists.

Older examples of Höfðaletur are carved on wood and are always deeply incised so that the letters are in relief. Modern examples may also be found on metal objects, such as wedding rings. According to Brynjúlfur Jónsson, Höfðaletur replaced the quite different Spónaletur ("spoon-letters") on spoons and other silver objects in the late nineteenth century.

Modern uses
Some Icelandic font developers have experimented with Höfðaletur, including Gunnlaug Briem, Hörður Lárusson, Sigurður Orri Þórhannesson and Sól Hrafnsdóttir.

The National Museum of Iceland uses höfðaletur as part of their visual identity.

References

Further reading 
  (Internet archive)
 Gunnlaugur S.E. Briem, "Höfðaletur: A Study of Icelandic Ornamental Lettering from the Sixteenth Century to the Present," PhD Thesis, Royal College of Art, 1980 OCLC 59061463.

External links
 Gauntlet, by Gunnlaug Briem, a modern font based on Höfðaletur
 Award-winning advertising campaign for Nordic Music Days Iceland, 2006 by Hörður Lárusson, Sigurður Orri Þórhannesson and Sól Hrafnsdóttir using a new font called Rich Hard based on Höfðaletur

Blackletter
Typography